Acianthera barthelemyi is a species of orchid plant native to French Guiana.

References 

barthelemyi
Plants described in 1995